Socks Glacier is a small glacier descending the east slopes of Queen Alexandra Range just north of Owen Hills to enter the west side of Beardmore Glacier. Discovered by the British Antarctic Expedition (1907–09) and named for one of the ponies taken with the South Pole Party. Socks, the last pony to survive the journey, fell into a crevasse on 7 December 1908, on Beardmore Glacier near Socks Glacier.

See also
 List of glaciers in the Antarctic

References

Glaciers of the Ross Dependency
Shackleton Coast